Lazybones or "Lazy Bones" is a Tin Pan Alley song written in 1933, with lyrics by Johnny Mercer and music by Hoagy Carmichael.

Mercer was from Savannah, Georgia, and resented the Tin Pan Alley attitude of rejecting Southern regional vernacular in favor of artificial Southern songs written by people who had never been to the South. Alex Wilder attributes much of the popularity of this song to Mercer's perfect regional lyric.

He wrote the lyrics to "Lazybones" as a protest against those artificial "Dixies", announcing the song's authenticity at the start with "Long as there is chicken gravy on your rice".

Recordings 

The song has been recorded scores of times over the years. Recordings were released as early as 1933 by Jay Wilbur, Paul Robeson, and 1934 by the Mills Brothers, and as recently as 2018 by Nellie McKay. It has been recorded by a variety of artists in a variety of formats, including country singers such as Hank Snow on the album Old Doc Brown in 1955, R&B artists such as the Supremes on their 1965 album The Supremes Sing Country, Western and Pop, Leon Redbone on his 1975 album On the Track, and even fictional characters such as the Electric Mayhem band on the Muppet Show in 1977. Jonathan King's 1971 revival was a top 20 hit in the UK and was played on US soft rock stations, earning a position on Billboard's Easy Listening chart, reached #34. King's version sold over a million copies around the world.

Notes

External links
Lyrics
"Lazybones" - Lead sheet at wikifonia.org

1933 songs
1971 singles
Songs with music by Hoagy Carmichael
Songs with lyrics by Johnny Mercer
Mildred Bailey songs
Jonathan King songs
We Five songs
Jazz compositions in B-flat major